The 2014 Le Samyn des Dames was the third running of the women's Le Samyn, a women's bicycle race in Fayt-le-Franc, Belgium. It was held on 5 March 2014 over a distance of  starting in Frameries and finishing in Dour. It was rated by the UCI as a 1.2 category race.

Results

References

See also
 2014 in women's road cycling

Le Samyn des Dames
Le Samyn des Dames
Le Samyn des Dames